The 1851 Pennsylvania gubernatorial election occurred on October 14, 1851. Incumbent governor William F. Johnston, a Whig, was a candidate for re-election but was defeated by Democratic candidate William Bigler.

Results

References

1851
Pennsylvania
Gubernatorial
November 1851 events